The 2016 Malaysia Super Series Premier was the third super series tournament of the 2016 BWF Super Series. The tournament took place in Shah Alam, Malaysia from April 5–April 10, 2016 and had a total purse of $550,000.

Men's singles

Seeds

Top half

Bottom half

Finals

Women's singles

Seeds

Top half

Bottom half

Finals

Men's doubles

Seeds

Top half

Bottom half

Finals

Women's doubles

Seeds

Top half

Bottom half

Finals

Mixed doubles

Seeds

Top half

Bottom half

Finals

References 

2016
Super Series
2016 BWF Super Series